Balingen (Swabian: Balenga) is a town in Baden-Württemberg, Germany, capital of the district of Zollernalbkreis. It is located near the Swabian Jura, approx. 35 km to the south of Tübingen, 35 km northeast of Villingen-Schwenningen, and 70 km south southwest of Stuttgart.

It is home to the Bizerba and Ideal companies.

History
Balingen is first mentioned in 863. Initially a possession of the lords of Haigerloch, in 1162 it was acquired by the count of Hohenberg. In the 13th century it received the title of city from Friedrich der Erlauchte, it was largely rebuilt on the left bank of the river Eyach.

In 1403 it was sold to the County of Württemberg, whose chancellor maintained a residence there until the 18th century.

Balingen became part of the unified Germany in 1870.

Main sights
The city was destroyed by a fire in 1809, from which only the Protestant church, the castle and a few other edifices escaped. The Protestant church's construction finished in 1541; it has a characteristic sundial in the apse.

The castle was reconstructed in 1935.

Sulfor spring

In Balingen there is the enclosed, publicly accessible sulfur spring, whose water is said to have healing powers and support the immune system. As with the medicinal springs in Bad Sebastiansweiler, the spring is made up of dissolved, sulfur-containing sodium hydrogen carbonate (Na-HCO3) from the rock (Black Jura). When the rock containing pyrites (pyrite) is weathered, the oxidation of the pyrite with subsequent bacterial reduction of the sulfate ion produces hydrogen sulfide (H2S). It gives the mineral water the smell of rotten eggs. It contains  dissolved substances and hydrogen sulfide. Visitors who regularly drink from it should note that the daily intake of hydrogen sulfide does not exceed the limit of 100 mg.

Nickname

World Capital
Balingen call Waagenstadt  the metropolis of scales. The father Philipp Matthäus Hahn behind the original idea.

Frommern call Möbelstadt  the metropolis o of furniture in the time of Wirtschaftswunder.  In Frommern a line of high polished industrial production ( fine veneered wood) take up the ideas of the royal Hofebenist. In the Haus der Volkskunstof the Schwäbischer Albverein the traditional Himmelbett is use as a hotel bed.

Notable people
 Gregor Reisch (1470–1525), university teacher and monk, representative of the philosophical school of the late scholastic realists
 Joseph Weiß (c. 1487–1565), also  Joseph White painter of Balingen  and possibly the  Master of Meßkirch , painter of the Renaissance
 Marx Weiß (c. 1518–1580), the Younger, also  Marx White from Balingen , painter of Late Gothic

 Johann Tobias Beck (1804–1878), Protestant theologian
 Heinrich Lang (1826–1876), theologian
 Martin Haug (1827–1876), orientalist
 Robert Wahl (1882–1955), entrepreneur and local politicians
 Heinrich Haasis (born 1945), mayor, Member of Parliament, President of the German Savings Bank Association (2006–2012) 
 Joachim Schmid (born 1955), painter
 Martin Schaudt (born 1958), dressage rider
 Michael Hennrich (born 1965), politician (CDU), Member of Parliament
 Christoph Sieber (born 1970), comedian
 Kathrin Lang (born 1986), biathlete
 Frank Lehmann (born 1989), soccer goalkeeper
 Pascal Bodmer (born 1991), ski jumper
 Florian Kath (born 1994), football player

Personalities who have worked locally

 Johann Murer,  Karsthans (1490–1525), Lutherean priest, arrested at the Church of Balingen, was a prisoner in the tower of Balingen
 Karl Friedrich Reinhard (1761–1837), French diplomat, statesman and writer of German origin, grew partly up in Balingen  
 Andreas Bizer (1839–1914), mechanic and industrialist, co-founder of Bizerba

Geography

Climate 
Using the 0 °C isotherm, Balingen has a humid continental climate (Köppen: Dfb).

Twin towns – sister cities

Balingen is twinned with:
 Royan, France

Natural Sport
 trail mountainbike Tieringen Albtrauf to Balingen-Weilstetten Lochenpass  4,7 km  car road,  bike trail 1,9 km downhill.

References

External links

 Official website 

Towns in Baden-Württemberg
Zollernalbkreis
Württemberg